The East Branch Sebasticook River is a tributary of the Sebasticook River in central Maine in the United States. It is part of the Kennebec River watershed.

See also
List of rivers of Maine

References

Maine Streamflow Data from the USGS
Maine Watershed Data From Environmental Protection Agency

Tributaries of the Kennebec River
Rivers of Penobscot County, Maine
Rivers of Somerset County, Maine
Dexter, Maine
Newport, Maine
Rivers of Maine